The Hiloula of Rabbi Isaac Ben Walid is the hiloula, or anniversary of the death of rabbi Isaac Ben Walid. It is one of the most popular hiloulot in North Africa.

History
Rabbi Isaac Ben Walid was not only a religious leader, but also made efforts to improve the education of the Jewish community in the city of Tétouan, founding the first-ever school of the Alliance Israélite Universelle in the city in 1862.  After passing away on the 9th of Adar Sheni of the year 5630 of the Jewish Calendar at the age of 93, his tomb became a pilgrimage site, as well as the study room he had in the upper room of his synagogue, built in 1889 Today, the tomb as well as his synagogue are visited on the anniversary of his death by Moroccan Jews from France, Israel, Panama, Venezuela, Canada and other countries where they settled. As customary in the Haketia-speaking communities of former Spanish Morocco, chants are sung in that dialect of the Judeo-Spanish language.

Diaspora
On the hiloula of Rabbi Ben Walid, Moroccan Jews celebrate by singing bakashot at community centers or synagogues.

Legend
There is a legend that says that his walking stick has mystical healing powers, especially for pregnant women experiencing difficulties during their pregnancy, as well as women with fertility issues.

See also
Isaac Ben Walid Synagogue
Mellah of Tétouan

External links
Hiloulá - Peregrinación a la tumba del Rabbí Isaac Bengualid (Tetuán - Marruecos) on YouTube

References

Tétouan
Jews and Judaism in Morocco
Jewish pilgrimage sites